The Kalhora is a Baloch tribe of Sindh, Pakistan, they claim Arab origin and direct descendants from Al-Hakim I and ultimately Abbas ibn Abd al-Muttalib, companion and paternal uncle of Islamic prophet Muhammad.

They founded the Kalhora Dynasty that ruled the Sindh stretched from Karachi to Multan and Dera Ghazi Khan for nearly a century from 1701 – 1783 CE.

See also 
 Mian Atur Khan Kalhoro
 Tomb paintings of Sindh
 Battle at Khore
 Battle of Kachhi

References 

Social groups of Pakistan
Sindhi tribes
Surnames
Kalhora dynasty